Kelley Brisbon Hodge (born November 17, 1971) is an American attorney and politician who is a United States district judge of the United States District Court for the Eastern District of Pennsylvania. She served as the 25th District Attorney of Philadelphia. She is a member of the Democratic Party. After being elected on July 20, 2017, by the Philadelphia Court of Common Pleas Board of Judges, Hodge was sworn in on July 24, 2017, making her the first African American woman to serve as district attorney in the Commonwealth of Pennsylvania.

Early life and education 
Hodge grew up in Montgomery County, Pennsylvania, and attended Mount Saint Joseph Academy. She attended the University of Virginia, where she received her Bachelor of Arts Degree in foreign affairs and in Spanish Language and Literature in 1993. She then went on to earn a Juris Doctor from the University of Richmond T.C. Williams School of Law in 1996.

Career 
She became a public defender in Richmond, Virginia, in 1997. She joined the Philadelphia District Attorney's Office in 2004, and afterward worked in the private sector. In 2011, Hodge was appointed to the Pennsylvania Commission on Crime and Delinquency as safe schools advocate in Philadelphia by Governor Tom Corbett, where she served until 2015. From 2015 to 2016, she was the Title IX coordinator and executive assistant to the president at the University of Virginia in Charlottesville. 

Hodge served as the interim district attorney from July 24, 2017, assuming the role following Rufus Seth Williams resignation, until January 1, 2018, when Larry Krasner took office.

From 2016 to 2017 and 2018 to 2020, Hodge was of counsel at the law firm of Elliott Greenleaf in Blue Bell, Pennsylvania. In April 2020, Hodge joined Fox Rothschild in the firm's Philadelphia office as a partner in the labor and employment department.

Federal judicial service 

On July 12, 2022, President Joe Biden nominated Hodge to serve as a United States district judge of the United States District Court for the Eastern District of Pennsylvania. President Biden nominated Hodge to the seat vacated by Judge Petrese B. Tucker, who assumed senior status on June 1, 2021. On September 7, 2022, a hearing on her nomination was held before the Senate Judiciary Committee. On September 28, 2022, her nomination was reported out of committee by a 13–9 vote. On December 6, 2022, the United States Senate invoked cloture on her nomination by a 52–43 vote. Later that day, her nomination was confirmed by a 52–44 vote. She received her judicial commission on December 23, 2022.

See also 
 List of African-American federal judges
 List of African-American jurists

References

External links

1971 births
Living people
20th-century American women lawyers
20th-century American lawyers
21st-century American judges
21st-century American women judges
21st-century American women lawyers
21st-century American lawyers
African-American judges
African-American lawyers
County district attorneys in Pennsylvania
Judges of the United States District Court for the Eastern District of Pennsylvania
Pennsylvania Democrats
People from Abington Township, Montgomery County, Pennsylvania
Public defenders
United States district court judges appointed by Joe Biden
University of Richmond School of Law alumni
University of Virginia alumni